Sven Martin Henric Holmberg (born 4 January 1946) is a Swedish actor, director and scriptwriter.

Biography
Holmberg started acting in different leftist theater groups, and in 1977 he participated in the Tent Project, a musical theater performance on the history of the Swedish working class movement, in which he had played the role of the Swedish Communist leader Zeth Höglund.

Holmberg has played many historical parts. He portrayed Rutger Macklean in Macklean, a 1993 drama show for Sveriges Television. Holmberg has also portrayed Adolf Hitler in the play Albert Speer at Gothenburg City Theatre in 2001, which was also later aired on TV.

References

External links

Swedish male actors
People from Växjö
1946 births
Living people
20th-century Swedish people